Vasile Nistor (born 9 June 1967) is a Romanian boxer. He competed in the men's lightweight event at the 1992 Summer Olympics.

References

1967 births
Living people
Romanian male boxers
Olympic boxers of Romania
Boxers at the 1992 Summer Olympics
Place of birth missing (living people)
AIBA World Boxing Championships medalists
Lightweight boxers